Scribner Lee Fauver (born June 1, 1931 - June 6, 2018) is a former member of the Ohio House of Representatives.

References

1931 births
Members of the Ohio House of Representatives
Living people